Emily Jane Thwaits (c. 1860 in Cape Town – 21 February 1906 in Cape Town) was a South African botanical illustrator.

Biography 
Emily was one of a family of seven, her sibling Frances Thwaits being another noted botanical illustrator who had contributed original paintings for Rudolf Marloth's "Flora of South Africa". Their grandfather, Thomas Thwaits, had come to Cape Town from England and had become art master at a school in Roeland Street founded by the Rev. James J. Beck.

References

Botanical illustrators
1906 deaths
Year of birth uncertain
People from Cape Town